The Petite rivière Missisquoi Nord is a tributary of the Missisquoi River North, in the administrative region of Estrie, in the province of Quebec, in Canada. This watercourse crosses the territory of the municipalities of:
 Bolton-Ouest, in the MRC of Brome-Missisquoi;
 Saint-Étienne-de-Bolton, in the MRC of Memphrémagog.

Geography 

The Petite rivière Missisquoi Nord rises at the mouth of an unidentified small lake located on the west side of the road Summit in the eastern part of the municipality of Bolton-Ouest, almost at the limit of Saint-Étienne-de-Bolton.

  towards the north especially in Bolton-Ouest by first forming a loop towards the east (which is in Saint-Étienne-de-Bolton) where the river cuts Summit road and Vincent-Ferrier-Clair road, then crosses a small lake before cutting Summit road again, to Mountain road;
  towards the east by first forming a hook towards the north to collect a stream (coming from the northwest) and another stream (coming from the southwest), until mountain range road;
  towards the north-east, crossing the road to Bolton Center and passing on the south-east side of the village of Saint-Étienne-de-Bolton, to a bend in the river located south side of rue Cloutier, which corresponds to the outlet of a stream (coming from the north);
  towards the south-east by following more or less the path of Bolton Center and by cutting the path of the 1st range, by collecting three streams (each coming from the southwest) and a stream ( coming from the north-east) and crossing the Étang Gras to its mouth;
  south along the east side of the Bolton Center road and bending south-east, then south, to its mouth.

The "Petite rivière Missisquoi Nord" flows on the west bank of the Missisquoi River North, just north of the village of Bolton-Center.

Toponymy 

The toponym "Petite Rivière Missisquoi Nord" was formalized on December 5, 2013 at the Commission de toponymie du Québec.

Notes and references

See also 
 Memphrémagog Regional County Municipality
 Brome-Missisquoi Regional County Municipality
 Missisquoi River North
 Missisquoi River
 Lake Champlain
 Richelieu River
 List of rivers of Quebec

External links 

Rivers of Estrie
Rivers of Montérégie
Memphrémagog Regional County Municipality
Brome-Missisquoi Regional County Municipality